Surveyor 2 was to be the second lunar lander in the uncrewed American Surveyor program to explore the Moon. It was launched September 20, 1966 from Cape Kennedy, Florida aboard an Atlas-Centaur rocket.
A mid-course correction failure resulted in the spacecraft losing control. Contact was lost with the spacecraft  at 9:35 UTC, September 22.

Background

On February 3, 1966 the Luna 9 spacecraft was the first spacecraft to achieve a lunar soft landing and to transmit photographic data to Earth. Several months later, Surveyor 1 launched on May 30, 1966; and landed on Oceanus Procellarum on June 2, 1966, also transmitting photographic data back to Earth.

This spacecraft was the second of a series designed to achieve a soft landing on the Moon and to return lunar surface photography for determining characteristics of the lunar terrain for Apollo program lunar landing missions. Besides transmitting photos, Surveyor 2 was planned to perform a 'bounce', to photograph underneath its own landing site. It was also equipped to return data on radar reflectivity of the lunar surface, bearing strength of the lunar surface, and spacecraft temperatures for use in the analysis of lunar surface temperatures.

Failure
The target area proposed was within Sinus Medii. The Atlas-Centaur had placed Surveyor 2 on a path to the Moon that was only 130 km from its aim point. During the midcourse correction maneuver, one vernier thruster failed to ignite, resulting in an unbalanced thrust that caused the spacecraft to tumble for its remaining 54 hours. Attempts to salvage the mission failed. Contact was lost with the spacecraft  at 9:35 UTC, September 22.  The spacecraft was targeted at Sinus Medii, but crashed near Copernicus crater. The spacecraft was calculated to have impacted the lunar surface at 03:18 UTC, September 23, 1966. Its weight on impact was 644 lb (292 kg), and speed was about 6000 miles an hour (2.6 km/s = 5840 mph), slightly over lunar escape velocity (2.4 km/s) and similar to the impact velocities of the Ranger program spacecraft.

Aftermath
Lunar exploration continued to be challenging. The next Soviet mission, Cosmos 111, was launched on March 1, 1966, but failed to reach a proper lunar trajectory, re-entering Earth's atmosphere two days later. Surveyor 3 soft-landed on April 20, 1967 at the Mare Cognitum portion of the Oceanus Procellarum. It transmitted a total of 6,315 television images to the Earth.

There were seven Surveyor missions; five were successful.  Surveyors 2 and 4 failed. Each consisted of a single uncrewed spacecraft designed and built by Hughes Aircraft Company. The precise location of the Surveyor 2 crash site is unknown.

Centaur booster

The Centaur rocket used to launch Surveyor continued on its original trajectory past the Moon, placing it into a solar orbit similar to that of the Earth. The booster was untracked from that point forward. In August 2020, NASA announced the sighting of an object in a solar orbit which could shortly make a close pass with the Earth. On September 23, 2020, NASA announced that this was likely the lost Centaur booster, and likely to be re-captured into Earth orbit. This would be the second time that a booster has done so, after the upper stage of a Saturn V rocket from the Apollo 12 launch re-entered Earth orbit in 2002. In December 2020, NASA confirmed that it was the lost Centaur booster.

See also

 List of artificial objects on the Moon

References

External links
Labeled Lunar Orbiter 4 photograph showing the Surveyor 2 crash site: IV-114-H1 
Surveyor 2 flight performance Final report - Jan 1967 (PDF)
Surveyor Program Results (PDF) 1969

2
Spacecraft launched in 1966
Missions to the Moon
Spacecraft launched by Atlas-Centaur rockets
Spacecraft that impacted the Moon
1966 on the Moon